Josef Německý (December 6, 1900 – June 10, 1943) was a Czechoslovakian cross-country skier who competed in the 1924 Winter Olympics and in the 1928 Winter Olympics.

He was born in Nové Město na Moravě. He was the older brother of Otakar Německý.

In 1924 he finished 17th in the 50 kilometre event at the Chamonix Olympics.

Four years later he finished eleventh in the 50 kilometre competition at the St. Moritz Games.

External links
 Profile 

1900 births
1943 deaths
Czech male cross-country skiers
Czechoslovak male cross-country skiers
Olympic cross-country skiers of Czechoslovakia
Cross-country skiers at the 1924 Winter Olympics
Cross-country skiers at the 1928 Winter Olympics
People from Nové Město na Moravě
Sportspeople from the Vysočina Region